John Fendall Ragland Jr. (September 26, 1874 – February 10, 1925) was an American physician and politician who served in the Virginia House of Delegates.

References

External links 

1874 births
1925 deaths
Members of the Virginia House of Delegates
20th-century American politicians